Colin Frederick Jacobsen  (born 13 April 1937), better known by his stage name Col Joye, is an Australian pioneer rock singer-songwriter, musician and entrepreneur with a career spanning almost sixty-five years. Joye was the first Australian rock and roll singer to have a number one record Australia-wide, and experienced a string of chart successes in the early Australian rock and roll scene,  performing with his then band the Joy Boys (formerly KJ Quintet).

Early life and education
Colin Jacobsen was born in Sydney, New South Wales, on 13 April 1937.

Graduating school, prior to stardom, he worked as a jewellery salesman.

Musical career
Jacobson, started performing and recording in the late 1950s with his backing band, originally called the KJ Quintet, the predecessor of what that would become the Joy Boys, which included his brothers Kevin and Keith.

As Col Joye he enjoyed a string of hits on the local and national singles charts of Australia beginning in 1959. Joye's first single, "Stagger Lee" was a cover of the Lloyd Price US original. However, his third single "Bye Bye Baby" (written by American Frank McNulty) reached No.3 on the Australian Kent Music Report charts in 1959, followed by "Rockin Rollin Clementine" also peaking at No. 3. His fifth single, "Oh Yeah Uh Huh", became his most successful, peaking at No. 1. He also had other charting singles, including "Yes Sir That's My Baby" peaking at No. 5 nationally.

Joye was an original member of the television program Bandstand, and appeared regularly on the show over a fourteen year period. He toured Australia with fellow acts  that where featured on the program, including Judy Stone, the De Kroo Brothers, Sandy Scott and Little Pattie. Joye's popularity levelled off after the changes to the music scene associated with the rise of the Beatles, and it was not until 1973 that he had another hit record, with "Heaven Is My Woman's Love" reaching No. 1 on the Go-Set charts that year.

He has also recorded various other cross-over styles such as country music.

Entrepreneurship
During the period between personal musical successes in the late 50s and early 1960s, Col and Kevin Jacobsen built an influential entertainment management, publishing and recording business, including ATA Studios in Glebe, New South Wales. This business worked with developing and promoting artists including the Bee Gees, and their brother Andy Gibb. Their promotions company, Jacobsen Entertainment, continued into the 2000s, with Col and Kevin remaining as principal directors.

Personal life
In 1990, while pruning a neighbour's tree with a chainsaw as a favour, Joye slipped and fell six metres onto brick paving below, striking his head and falling into a coma, as well as sustaining serious lower back and shoulder injuries. Initially given a poor prognosis, he eventually recovered to start performing and touring again in 1998.

Honours, awards and recognition
On 8 June 1981, he was appointed as a Member of the Order of Australia for his entertainment and philanthropic work.

The ARIA Music Awards in 1988, inducted Joye into the ARIA Hall of Fame.

|-
| 1988 || Col Joye || ARIA Hall of Fame|| 
|-

Country Music Awards (CMAA)
The Country Music Awards (CMAA), are an annual awards ceremony celebrating recording excellence in the Australian country music industry. It commenced in 1973, the following year Joye won an award for "Top Selling Album of the Year"

 (wins only)
|-
| 1974 || Heaven Is My Woman's Love  || Top Selling Album of the Year || 
|-

Mo Awards
The Australian Entertainment Mo Awards (commonly known informally as the Mo Awards), were annual Australian entertainment industry awards. They recognise achievements in live entertainment in Australia from 1975 to 2016. Col Joye won two awards in that time.
 (wins only)
|-
| 1980
| Col Joye
| John Campbell Fellowship Award
| 
|-
| 1988
| Col Joye
| Most Outstanding Club Act
| 
|-

Others
In 1998, Australia Post issued a special-edition set of twelve stamps celebrating the early years of Australian rock and roll, featuring Australian hit songs from the late 1950s to the early 1970s. One of the stamps commemorated Joye, based on the song "Oh Yeah Uh Huh". Australia Post wrote that "Each of them said something about us, and told the rest of the world this is what popular culture sounds like, and it has an Australian accent".

In 2010, "Bye Bye Baby" (1959), by Col Joye and the Joy Boys was added to the National Film and Sound Archive's Sounds of Australia register. The curator's notes said of "Bye Bye Baby", "There is not a lot to this pop song, written by American Frank McNulty, other than a catchy title hook. The lyrics are about the singer saying goodbye to his girlfriend and how lonely he will be without her until the next time they meet. The original recording was made using a nylon string guitar, bass (wonderfully out of tune in the beginning) and minimalist drums with Col Joye almost whispering the vocals (as he had a cold at the time). This is the released version, with added celeste and 'ooh-ahh' backing vocals from the Sapphires, presumably to give it a little more musical interest."

Backing vocals on "Bye Bye Baby" were by male trio The Sapphires. The Sapphires were Duke Finlay, Tony Garrick and Ned Hussey, a Sydney vocal trio formed in 1957, used as backing group for many Australian artists on studio recordings in the early 1960s. They also appeared in Lee Gordon concert shows, and wrote some songs.

Discography

Studio albums

Charting compilation albums

Charting singles

Other singles

Footnotes

References

1937 births
Living people
ARIA Award winners
ARIA Hall of Fame inductees
Australian businesspeople
Australian country singers
Australian guitarists
Australian male singers
Australian pop singers
Australian rock singers
Logie Award winners
Members of the Order of Australia
Musicians from Sydney